Leobordea adpressa is a species of flowering plant in the family Fabaceae. It is found in Lesotho and South Africa. Its natural habitat is temperate grassland.

References

Crotalarieae
Flora of Lesotho
Flora of South Africa
Least concern plants
Taxonomy articles created by Polbot
Taxa named by N. E. Brown